The 1939 All-Ireland Senior Hurling Championship was the 53rd staging of the All-Ireland Senior Hurling Championship since its establishment by the Gaelic Athletic Association in 1887. The championship began on 7 May 1939 and ended on 3 September 1939.

Dublin entered the championship as the defending champions, however, they were beaten by Kilkenny in the Leinster final.

The All-Ireland final was played on 3 September 1939 at Croke Park in Dublin, between Kilkenny and Cork, in what was their first meeting in a final in nine years. Kilkenny won the match by 2-07 to 3-03 to claim their 12th championship title overall and a first title since 1935. The 1939 All-Ireland final remains one of the most iconic of all time. Played on the day that Britain declared war on Germany, the climax of the match took place during a terrific thunderstorm and earned the sobriquet of the "thunder and lightning final".

Kilkenny's Jim Langton was the championship's top scorer with 1-20.

Teams

A total of thirteen teams contested the championship, including all of the teams from the 1938 championship. Wexford re-entered the championship after a one-year absence.

Team summaries

Results

Leinster Senior Hurling Championship

First round

Second round

Wexford received a bye in this round.

Semi-finals

Final

Munster Senior Hurling Championship

First round

Semi-finals

Final

All-Ireland Senior Hurling Championship

Semi-final

Final

Championship statistics

Scoring statistics

Top scorers overall

Top scorers in a single game

Miscellaneous

 Kilkenny's victory over Cork in the All-Ireland final was the fourth time that Kilkenny beat them by just a single point. Previous one-point wins came in 1904, 1907 and 1912.  Among the attendance was the poet Louis MacNeice who was visiting Dublin.

Sources

 Corry, Eoghan, The GAA Book of Lists (Hodder Headline Ireland, 2005).
 Donegan, Des, The Complete Handbook of Gaelic Games (DBA Publications Limited, 2005).
 Horgan, Tim, Christy Ring: Hurling's Greatest (The Collins Press, 2007).
 Nolan, Pat, Flashbacks: A Half Century of Cork Hurling (The Collins Press, 2000).
 Sweeney, Éamonn, Munster Hurling Legends (The O'Brien Press, 2002).

References

1939
All-Ireland Senior Hurling Championship